John Dyer Baizley is an American musician and painter most notable for being the vocalist and rhythm guitarist of Savannah, Georgia heavy metal band Baroness. He has also achieved critical praise for his artworks, some of which have been incorporated into album art or T-shirts for artists such as Kvelertak, Kylesa, Pig Destroyer, Darkest Hour, Daughters, Skeletonwitch, Torche, Cursed, Black Tusk, Vitamin X, Flight of the Conchords, The Red Chord, Gillian Welch, Metallica, and his own band, Baroness.

Discography

Red Album (2007)
Blue Record (2009)
Yellow & Green (2012)
Purple (2015)
Gold & Grey (2019)

See also
:Category:Albums with cover art by John Dyer Baizley

References 

Living people
Guitarists from Georgia (U.S. state)
Album-cover and concert-poster artists
American heavy metal guitarists
20th-century American painters
American male painters
21st-century American painters
American male guitarists
1977 births
20th-century American male artists